{{Infobox character
|colour = pink 
|name        = Glinda
|series      = Oz
|image       = The marvelous land of Oz; being an account of the further adventures of the Scarecrow and Tin Woodman a sequel to the Wizard of Oz (1904) (14566659598).jpg
|caption     = Glinda depicted in The Marvelous Land of Oz, illustrated by John R. Neill
|first       = The Wonderful Wizard of Oz (1900)
|last        = 
|portrayer   = {{Plainlist|
Billie Burke (The Wizard of Oz)
Lena Horne (The Wiz)
Kristin Chenoweth (Wicked)
Uzo Aduba (The Wiz Live!)
Loretta Devine (The Wiz 1995 Apollo Theater revival)
Miss Piggy/Eric Jacobson (The Muppets' Wizard of Oz)
LaChanze (The Wiz Encores!)
Michelle Williams (Oz the Great and Powerful)
Sunny Mabrey (Once Upon a Time)
Joely Richardson (Emerald City)
Ariana Grande (Wicked film adaptation)}}
|nationality = Ozian of Quadling descent
|voice       = 
|alias       = 
|species     = Unhuman witchImmortal witchSorceress enchantressFairy/Goddess
|gender      = Woman
|occupation  = Immortal and unhuman witchProtector of OzRuler of the Quadling CountryProtector of Princess Ozma, the Princess of Oz
|title       = The GoodThe Good Witch of the northThe Sorceress of the northThe Royal Sorceress of Oz
|creator     = L. Frank Baum
}}
Glinda is a fictional character created by L. Frank Baum for his Oz novels. She first appears in Baum's 1900 children's classic The Wonderful Wizard of Oz, and is the most powerful sorceress in the Land of Oz, ruler of the Quadling Country South of the Emerald City, and protector of Princess Ozma.

Literature
L. Frank Baum
Baum's 1900 children's novel The Wonderful Wizard of Oz refers to Glinda as the "Good Witch of the South"; she does not appear in the novel until late in its development.  After the Wizard flies away in his balloon, the Cowardly Lion, Scarecrow, Tin Woodman, Dorothy, and Toto travel South to the land of the Quadlings to ask Glinda for her advice. In the well-known 1939 film version, Glinda is a composite character with the Witch of the North.  Later books call her a "Sorceress" rather than a "witch", though Baum's writings make clear that he did not view witches as inherently wicked.

In the books, Glinda is depicted as a beautiful young woman with long, rich rare red hair and blue eyes, wearing a pure white dress. She is much older than her appearance would suggest, but "knows how to keep young in spite of the many years she has lived" - a fact that is established in The Wonderful Wizard of Oz, by the Soldier with the Green Whiskers. She has ruled the Quadling Country ever since she overthrew the Wicked Witch of the South during the period when Ozma's grandfather was king of Oz.

Glinda plays the most active role in finding and restoring Princess Ozma, the rightful heir, to the throne of Oz, the search for whom takes place in the second book, The Marvelous Land of Oz, although Glinda had been searching for Ozma ever since the princess disappeared as a baby. It may well be that she did not overthrow the Wicked Witches of the East and West, despite being more powerful than they were, because she wanted all of Oz to be unified under its rightful ruler, Ozma, first. After Ozma's ascent to the throne, Glinda continues to help the Princess of Oz shape the future of the Land of Oz as a whole, no longer confining her powers to guarding her Quadling Kingdom in the South alone; true to her character, Glinda does not interfere in affairs of State unless Ozma seeks her counsel or help specifically.

In addition to her vast knowledge of magic, Glinda employs various tools, charms, and instruments in her workshop. The Emerald City of Oz reveals that she owns a Great Book of Records that allows her to track everything that goes on in the world from the instant it happens. Starting with The Road to Oz she trains the formerly humbug Wizard in magic; he becomes a formidable practitioner, but acknowledges that she is more powerful yet.

Glinda lives in a palace near the Northern border of the Quadling Country, attended by fifty beautiful maidens from each country of Oz. She also employs a large army of female soldiers, with which she takes on General Jinjur's Army of Revolt, who had conquered the Emerald City in The Marvelous Land of Oz. Men are not prominent in Glinda's court.

Glinda is strongly protective of her subjects in the South. She creates walled, gated communities for the rabbits of Bunnybury and the paper dolls of Miss Cuttenclip, showing a personal interest in the concerns of not only the humanoid Quadlings, but also the other inhabitants of her jurisdiction.

In The Emerald City of Oz, when Ozma goes to consult Glinda about the security of her Ozian citizens, the Sorceress seals off all of Oz from the Great Outside World, making Oz invisible to the eyes of mortals flying overhead in airplanes and such. However, unlike Ozma, Glinda is willing to ignore strife and oppression in remote corners of Oz like Jinxland and the Skeezer territory as long as it does not threaten the Emerald City or innocent outsiders. The readers are left with the sense that Glinda is experienced and seasoned to the point of knowing that there is not a magic cure for everything, and that certain things cannot be changed or perhaps should not be changed for better or for worse.

One of the more obscure facts about Glinda is that she created the Forbidden Fountain with the Waters of Oblivion, at the center of Oz, whose waters redeemed a former King of Oz who was exceptionally cruel. This happened "many centuries ago" according to Ozma (again alluding to Glinda's advanced age), and it is this fountain that saves Oz from the invading Nome King and his allies in The Emerald City of Oz, by making them forget their nefarious intentions. Glinda clearly made the Fountain at a point in Oz's history when the Land was unified under one of the members of the Royal Family of Oz, albeit a tyrannical king in this isolated incident, and so she was able to intervene in a way that she could not when the country was divided between the Wizard and the Wicked Witches of the East and West et al., prior to Dorothy's arrival.

Most intriguingly, in The Emerald City of Oz, when the Nome King considers invading Oz, he is told by a minion, General Guph, that Glinda the Good's castle is located "at the North of the Emerald City," when it has been established that Glinda rules the South, while another Witch (the one who welcomed Dorothy to Oz, and was retroactively named Tattypoo) reigned in the North. Guph may have gotten his facts muddled, as none of the Gnomes had been to Oz at that time, but it portends the depiction of Glinda as the Good Witch of the North rather than the South in the 1939 MGM film (which is the most widely known version of Oz to date).

General Guph also tells the Nome King that Glinda "commands the spirits of the air,". As mentioned above, he is not an expert on Oz, but this statement made by Guph once again foreshadows a much later cinematic rendition of Glinda, in the film version of the Broadway musical The Wiz in which Glinda (played by Lena Horne) and the original (played by Billie Burke) is responsible for the twister that brings Dorothy's house to Oz and sets all subsequent events into motion.

Of all the characters in L. Frank Baum's Oz, Glinda is the most enigmatic. Despite being titled "Glinda the Good," she is not a one-dimensional caricature whose sole purpose is to embody and generate all that is generically considered "good," as indicated above.

She ultimately becomes the adult anchor in the Oz books, because she is never distracted or swayed, and always maintains absolute firmness of purpose - something that cannot be said for the other adult characters in the series such as the Wizard and the Shaggy Man or even the Good Witch of the North. They all fall short of Glinda's wisdom and resoluteness.

In Baum's final book, Glinda of Oz, we learn that Glinda resides in a castle with one hundred of the most beautiful women in Oz at her beck and call.

In Alexander Volkov's Magic Land series, the witch is called Stella and appears very rarely. However, she is often referred to by the author and the characters and always offers people help or refuge during hard times. She is described as a golden-haired eternally young beauty in a pink dress. She rules the Pink Country which is inhabited by the tribe of Chatterboxes. She seems to be a good friend of the Winged Monkeys ever since releasing them.

In Philip Jose Farmer's novel A Barnstormer in Oz, Glinda is portrayed as young and beautiful enough to attract the protagonist, though the interest is not mutual.

Wicked (novel)
In Gregory Maguire's 1995 revisionist novel Wicked: The Life and Times of the Wicked Witch of the West, she is initially called "Galinda," and (through her mother) is descended from the noble clan of the Arduennas of the Upland. Her character is seen extensively in the first half of the novel, but disappears for most of the second half, compared to her musical counterpart.

Though originally snobbish and superficial, she is also intelligent enough to be accepted to Shiz University's Crage Hall, where she is assigned to share a room with Elphaba. After a long period of mutual loathing, the two girls later become close friends.

Galinda drops the first 'a' in her name in the middle of the story, in tribute to Doctor Dillamond, a martyred Goat who taught at Shiz (Dillamond made the habitual mistake of calling her "Glinda" instead of "Galinda" while they shared a carriage, before her arrival to the university). The Goat's death also prompts Glinda to re-evaluate her life, and she dedicates herself to studying sorcery, at which she proves to be quite skilled.

It is stated that she marries Sir Chuffrey in the second half of the novel, and they have no children. She initially dislikes Elphaba's sister Nessarose (who goes on to become the Wicked Witch of the East), but becomes close to her after Elphaba leaves Shiz, and enchants the Silver Shoes that enable Nessarose to walk without any assistance.

As in the original Oz books, she is revered as a powerful sorceress. Maguire follows the 1939 movie in having Glinda ultimately become the Witch of the North, not the South. Glinda also appears in Son of a Witch, Maguire's sequel to Wicked, now widowed from Sir Chuffrey.

Films and popular culture

 The Fairylogue and Radio-Plays (1908) 
In The Fairylogue and Radio-Plays, Glinda was portrayed by Evelyn Judson. She was played by Olive Cox in the 1910 version of The Wonderful Wizard of Oz. In the latter, she appears in one scene in which she enlarges Toto to make him a better protector for Dorothy.

The Wizard of Oz – 1939 MGM film

In the 1939 film version of The Wizard of Oz, Glinda is the Good Witch of the North. She is played in the film by Billie Burke. Glinda performs the functions of not only the novel's Good Witch of the North and Good Witch of the South, but also the novel's Queen of Field Mice, by being the one who welcomes Dorothy to Oz, sends her "off to see the Wizard," and orchestrates her rescue from the deadly poppy field in addition to revealing the secret to going back home.

Like Aunt Em and Uncle Henry, who do not have Oz counterparts, Glinda does not have a sepia-tone Kansas counterpart. 
However, when performed on stage, the actress playing Aunt Em will sometimes also play Glinda.

 The Wonderful Land of Oz (1969) 
In The Wonderful Land of Oz, Glinda is played by Hilary Lee Gaess; her singing voice was dubbed. She is portrayed as much younger than the Billie Burke incarnation, although her pink costume/gown is similar. She sings 2 stirring solos titled "Try To Touch a Star" and "I've Watched Over You." In the latter song, she makes the touching and astute observation that the Scarecrow possesses not only a brain, but also a heart (at least metaphorically).

She is able to summon the powers of "all the good fairies" when restoring Princess Ozma to her rightful form, almost making her equal to L. Frank Baum's Queen Lurline (whereas Baum's Glinda is a stately sorceress showing no association with fairy magic or "unscrupulous" witchcraft, insisting that the witch Mombi herself disenchant Ozma unlike in this film). Apart from undoing Mombi's evil magic herself, this incarnation of Glinda also tells the old Gillikin witch that she has "allowed" her to practice some of her "less horrible tricks" thus far, suggesting that every practitioner of magic in Oz is ultimately answerable to Glinda should they go too far.

 Filmation's Journey Back to Oz (1972) 
In Journey Back to Oz, the unofficial sequel to the 1939 film, operatic mezzo-soprano Risë Stevens provides the voice of "Glinda, the Good Fairy" as she is described in the opening title sequence (however, the Cowardly Lion refers to her as the Good Witch of the North later in the film). In L. Frank Baum's novel, The Lost Princess of Oz, the Wizard says: "Ozma is a fairy, and so is Glinda, so no power can kill or destroy them, but you girls are all mortals and so are Button-Bright and I, so we must watch out for ourselves." However, the only fact established by this statement is that Glinda is one of Oz's "fairy people" (L. Frank Baum's term for anyone native to an enchanted land) rather than a Fairy proper. Even the citizens of Oz who do not possess magical powers are referred to as "fairy people" by Baum in The Emerald City of Oz, meaning that they are not mortals like Dorothy and the Wizard who were born in the outside world.

In this film, it is revealed that this Glinda's magic is no match for Mombi's (the exact opposite was true in Baum's original books). Still, she helps Dorothy confront Mombi and her army of green elephants in a way that evokes the help offered by the Queen of Field Mice in Baum's The Land of Oz. She sings a climactic song called "You Have Only You (To Look To)" to Dorothy, making her look inside herself for the strength that is not forthcoming from old companions such as the Tin Woodman and the Cowardly Lion. In this regard, Glinda reveals how in touch she is with stark reality, a trait that hearkens back to Baum's original Glinda.

At the end of the film, she sends Dorothy back to Kansas by conjuring up another tornado. This too is in keeping with L. Frank Baum's original Glinda, who had the power to "command the spirits of the air" according to The Emerald City of Oz.

 The Wizard of Oz (1982) 
In the 1982 film The Wizard of Oz, Glinda, looking very young and with long blonde hair, voiced by Wendy Thatcher, claims to be the sister of the Good Witch of the North despite the appearance of quite a large age gap (Baum did always say she is much older than she looks), and appears in the Emerald City in a deus ex machina similar to the MGM film.

 Return to Oz (1985) 
Glinda appears in Return to Oz. She is seen in the background at the coronation of Princess Ozma.

 The Wonderful Wizard of Oz (1986 anime) 
In Panmedia's 1986 animated series, Glinda is portrayed as a tall and very slender sorceress with long blue hair. It is she who offers to make Dorothy a Princess of Oz in this series, during their very first encounter, but Dorothy maintains that she wishes to return to Kansas.

In Baum's The Land of Oz, Glinda categorically states that she does not engage in "transformations" because "they are not real", but in this series, the Good Witch transforms into an eagle in order to pursue Mombi, who attempts to fly away from the Emerald City in the form of a dragon.

After restoring Princess Ozma to the throne, Glinda uses her magic on Mombi and Jinjur to make them reform, when the witch and the rebel queen refuse to mend their villainous ways. Having thus changed Mombi and Jinjur's inherent natures, Glinda ensures that they will never create trouble for anyone again.

Glinda entrusts Dorothy with the task of preparing Ozma for her official coronation ceremony, confident that the maturer Dorothy will mould the series' playful young Ozma into a responsible queen. As the series draws to an end, Glinda telepathically contacts and saves Dorothy from falling to her death from a tower, following a confrontation with the Nome King and his minions.

DiC's The Wizard of Oz (1990)
Glinda appears in The Wizard of Oz voiced by B.J. Ward. Glinda's portrayal in this short-lived series is much more in keeping with the 1939 MGM film, although the character looks significantly younger than Billie Burke did, wears a white gown with pink embroidery (rather than a wholly pink gown), and has blonde hair. However, her voice and her personality are extremely close to the 1939 version of this Oz character. She arranges for Dorothy to return to the Land of Oz by means of the Ruby Slippers, because the Wicked Witch of the West has been brought back to life, and Glinda needs Dorothy's help to set things right again.

Wild at Heart (1990)
Actress Sheryl Lee portrays a version of the Good Witch, who appears in a hallucination to Nicolas Cage's character, Sailor Ripley, in David Lynch's 1990 black comedy thriller Wild at Heart. Glinda persuades Sailor to return to Lula Fortune (Laura Dern), his lover, and Pace, his six-year-old son during an hallucinatory conversation with her near the end of the film.

The Oz Kids (1996)
In The Oz Kids, Glinda becomes a mother and has a daughter Andrea. Voiced by Erika Schickel. Her daughter Andrea has a dress similar to Princess Ozma's.

The Muppets' Wizard of Oz (2005)
In The Muppets' Wizard of Oz, Glinda is the Good Witch of the South and is played by Miss Piggy, as are her sisters the Good Witch of the North and the two Wicked Witches. In keeping with the traditions of Muppet films, she is attracted to the Scarecrow (played by Kermit the Frog). She is portrayed in a lavender dress with a feather boa, an archetypal Hollywood starlet much more in keeping with the character of Miss Piggy rather than Glinda. Miss Piggy's other role is herself. Prior to Dorothy's journey, she appears with Kermit and tries to get rid of Dorothy. After Dorothy's journey, she returns for the Muppets' show.

Tom and Jerry and the Wizard of Oz (2011)
Frances Conroy voices Glinda in Tom and Jerry and the Wizard of Oz and Tom and Jerry: Back to Oz in 2016.

Supernatural (2013)
In the "LARP and the Real Girl" an episode of season 8 of Supernatural appears a fairy based in Glinda called Gilda. She describes herself as the good kind of fairy and is portrayed by Tiffany Dupont.

Oz the Great and Powerful (2013)

Glinda is portrayed by Michelle Williams in the 2013 Disney film Oz the Great and Powerful. In this prequel, she is Glinda the Good Witch of the South as well as the daughter of the slain king of Oz. Theodora (Mila Kunis) and Evanora (Rachel Weisz), are the future Wicked Witches of the West and East, respectively. In the film, she helps a good-hearted con artist named Oscar Diggs (James Franco) defeat her sisters and become the Wizard of Oz.

Legends of Oz: Dorothy's Return (2013)
Glinda was voiced by Bernadette Peters in the 3D animated film Legends of Oz: Dorothy's Return, which was released in 2014.

RWBY (2013)
In the American 3D anime RWBY, Glinda the Good Witch is represented by Glynda Goodwitch, a skilled Huntress with telekinetic abilities. Unlike her inspiration, Goodwitch, voiced by Kathleen Zuelch, possesses a noticeably short temper. Goodwitch serves as the right-hand associate of Professor Ozpin (whose likeness alludes to the Wizard of Oz) and plays an integral part in training the students of Beacon Academy to protect the world from evil forces.

Once Upon a Time (2014)

Glinda appears in the second half of Season Three of Once Upon a Time played by Sunny Mabrey. In a sisterhood of witches, Glinda, the Witch of the South, along with the Witch of the East (Sharon Taylor) and the Witch of the North (Karen Holness), protect Oz with each of their magic affinities. Only the fourth seat of the sisterhood—representing innocence—remains empty, but through Glinda's guardianship of the Book of Records, a prophecy foretells of a sorceress coming to Oz via a cyclone to join them. Secondly, the book also states this witch will "unseat the greatest evil the realm has ever seen". After seeing Zelena (Rebecca Mader) punish the deceitful Walsh/Wizard of Oz (Christopher Gorham), Glinda believes this woman, who arrived to Oz many years ago from a cyclone, will fulfill the prophecy. Though Zelena is more interested in changing her past, Glinda convinces the unsure redhead that her destiny lies in changing her own future by becoming a good witch, however, she does not tell Zelena about the second part of the prophecy. From joining the sisterhood, she gifts Zelena a pendant to harness her powers. While showing Zelena the western area of Oz, they approach wreckage from a cyclone and take in a girl, Dorothy Gale (Matreya Scarrwener). Zelena, from reading the Book of Records, believes Dorothy will become the Witch of the West and defeat her. Glinda doesn't believe this to be true, but she witnesses Zelena attack Dorothy, who causes her assailant to melt with water. Realizing the prophecy was right, Glinda offers Dorothy a place with the sisterhood, but the latter wishes to go home. With Zelena defeated, the Wizard reverts to his old self and thus Glinda helps her to return home with his assistance. Only after, Zelena reveals she masqueraded as the Wizard to get rid of Dorothy. Glinda vows to find another sorceress to fulfill the prophecy, but Zelena banishes her to the Enchanted Forest. In this new realm, she begins living in the north of woods, south of Rumpelstiltskin's (Robert Carlyle) castle, hidden in a pocket dimension of ice and snow, which only the pure of heart may enter through.

Sensing the incoming presence of Snow White (Ginnifer Goodwin) and Prince Charming (Josh Dallas) crossing into her realm, Glinda makes herself known to them. When Snow White asks for Regina's whereabouts since she was just with them, Glinda states that the Queen didn't meet the qualifications needed for entering through the door. The banished Good Witch briefly explains her past friendship with Zelena and tells them the Wicked Witch's greatest weakness is light magic. Recalling that her own daughter, Emma, is a product of the strongest magic of all—true love, Snow White believes she may be able to defeat Zelena. Glinda agrees with this sentiment; further prompting Snow White to go through with casting another Dark Curse to send everyone back to Storybrooke.

 Emerald City (2015) 
Glinda appears in the first season of Emerald City, portrayed by Joely Richardson (based on both the characters of Glinda the Good Witch and the Good Witch of the North from the L. Frank Baum's Oz Books). The Mistress of the North "Maiden of the Northern Light, Mother of the Sound and Pure" and one of the last Cardinal Witches of Oz, Glinda is an authoritative woman who has had a deep-seated hatred towards the Wizard (Vincent D'Onofrio) ever since he outlawed magic. Since the change of regime in Oz, Glinda also runs a boarding house for orphaned girls where she oversees their education and chooses the best of them to join the Wizard's High Council. It is revealed that she in fact conspires against the Wizard's rule and prepares to overthrow him, using the Wizard's councilwomen as spies and aiming to use the secretly raised young witches for war.Emerald City also has another witch half based on the Witch of the South, named Mother South, that is a cardinal witch together with her daughters Glinda, West and East. Mother South gave birth to all of the witches in Oz, over a thousand years ago.

 Dorothy and the Wizard of Oz (2017) 
Glinda appears in the cartoon series Dorothy and the Wizard of Oz, voiced by Grey Griffin. In this show, she is depicted as having an evil twin sister named Melinda the Mean (also voiced by Grey Griffin).

 Lost in Oz (2017) 
Glinda is one of the main characters in the animated TV series Lost in Oz. Voiced by Jennifer Hale, she is sought by Dorothy and her friends to help her return to Kansas.

 Wicked: Part One and Two (2024 and 2025) 
Ariana Grande was cast as Glinda The Good Witch in the upcoming Wicked two-part film adaptation. Both parts being released on Christmas day 2024 and 2025, respectively.

Musicals

The Wizard of Oz (1942, stage adaptation)
In 1942 the 1939 film was adapted into a stage musical for performance at The MUNY in St. Louis. This version has been performed widely throughout the United States. Glinda in this version is called the Sorceress of the North; and Broadway star and ballerina Patricia Bowman portrayed the role in its initial staging.

The Wiz
In the Broadway musical The Wiz, Glinda is the Good Witch of the South, as she appears in the Oz books. She appears only once at the end of the musical to help Dorothy return to Kansas from the Land of Oz. Glinda is the sister of Addaperle (Abrakadabra), Evillene (Sadista), and Evvamean, the other three witches of Oz. The role was originated by Dee Dee Bridgewater. In the film version, she is played by Lena Horne, and she causes the snowstorm that brings Dorothy to Oz. She is portrayed by Uzo Aduba in the 2015 television special.

WickedWicked is a musical with music and lyrics by Stephen Schwartz and book by Winnie Holzman. It is based on the 1995 Gregory Maguire novel Wicked: The Life and Times of the Wicked Witch of the West, an alternative telling of the 1939 film The Wizard of Oz and L. Frank Baum's classic 1900 story, The Wonderful Wizard of Oz. The musical is told from the perspective of the witches of the Land of Oz; its plot begins before and continues after Dorothy's arrival in Oz from Kansas, and it includes several references to the 1939 film and Baum's novel. Wicked'' tells the story of two unlikely friends, Elphaba (the Wicked Witch of the West) who was born in Munchkinland as well as Glinda of the Upper Uplands, Gillikin County. The two friends struggle through opposing personalities and viewpoints, rivalry over the same love-interest, reactions to the Wizard's corrupt government and, ultimately, Elphaba's public fall from grace. Kristin Chenoweth originated the role. Ariana Grande is slated to play the role in the upcoming film adaptation of the musical.

Actresses who have played Glinda in Wicked

Broadway, New York City
Kristin Chenoweth (October 2003 - July 2004) 
Jennifer Laura Thompson (July 2004 - May 2005)
Megan Hilty (May 2005 - May 2006)
Kate Reinders (May 2006 - January 2007)
Kendra Kassebaum (January – October 2007; May – November 2008)
Annaleigh Ashford (October 2007 - May 2008)
Alli Mauzey (November 2008 - August 2009; October 2012 - April 2013; September 2013 – February 2014) 
Erin Mackey (August 2009 - January 2010)
Katie Rose Clarke (January 2010 - September 2011; April – September 2013; December 2018 - April 2019)
Chandra Lee Schwartz (September 2011 - October 2012)
Jenni Barber (February – November 2014)
Kara Lindsay (December 2014 - January 2016; November 2016 - July 2017) 
Carrie St. Louis (February – October 2016)
Amanda Jane Cooper (July 2017 - December 2018)
Ginna Claire Mason (April 2019 – March 2020; September 2021 - January 2022)
Brittney Johnson (February 2022 - February 2023)
McKenzie Kurtz (February 2023 - Current)

First North American Tour (Emerald City)
Kendra Kassebaum (March 2005 - September 2006)
Megan Hilty (September - December 2006)
Christina DeCicco (January - November 2007)
Katie Rose Clarke (November 2007 - August 2009; November 2011 - February 2012)
Chandra Lee Schwartz (August 2009 - April 2011; July 2014 - March 2015)
Amanda Jane Cooper (April - November 2011)
Alli Mauzey (February - August 2012)
Patti Murin (August 2012 - February 2013)
Jennifer Gambatese (February - December 2013)
Gina Beck (December 2013 - July 2014)

Second North American Tour (Munchkinland)
Heléne Yorke (March 2009 – March 2010)
Natalie Daradich (March 2010 – September 2011)
Tiffany Haas (September 2011 – June 2012)
Jeanna De Waal (June 2012 – April 2013)
Hayley Podschun (April 2013 – March 2014)
Kara Lindsay (April – November 2014; October 2018 – February 2019)
Carrie St. Louis (November 2014 – December 2015)
Amanda Jane Cooper (December 2015 – March 2017)
Ginna Claire Mason (March 2017 – October 2018)
Erin Mackey (February – September 2019)
Allison Bailey (September 2019 – March 2020; August 2021 – March 2022)
Jennafer Newberry (March 2022 – Current)

Chicago, Illinois
Kate Reinders (June 2005 - January 2006)
Stacie Morgan Lewis (January - October 2006)
Erin Mackey (October 2006 - April 2008)
Kate Fahrner (April - June 2008)
Annaleigh Ashford (June 2008 - January 2009)

Los Angeles, California
Megan Hilty (February 2007 - May 2008; October 2008 - January 2009)
Erin Mackey (May - September 2008)

San Francisco, California
Kendra Kassebaum (January 2009 - June 2010)
Alli Mauzey (June - September 2010)

West End, London
Helen Dallimore (September 2006 - July 2007)
Dianne Pilkington (July 2007 - March 2010)
Louise Dearman (March 2010 - December 2011)
Gina Beck (December 2011 - November 2013)
Savannah Stevenson (November 2013 - September 2016)
Suzie Mathers (September 2016 - July 2017)
Sophie Evans (July 2017 - July 2019; September 2021 - January 2022)
Helen Woolf (July 2019 – March 2020; February 2022 - February 2023)
Lucy St Louis (February 2023 - Current)

1st UK/Ireland Tour
Emily Tierney (September 2013 - July 2015)

UK/International Tour
Carly Anderson (July 2016 - July 2017)

2nd UK/Ireland Tour
Helen Woolf (November 2017 - January 2019)

Melbourne, Australia
Lucy Durack (June 2008 - August 2009)

Sydney, Australia
Lucy Durack (September 2009 - September 2010)

Australian Tour
Lucy Durack (January - September 2011)

Asian Tour
Suzie Mathers (December 2011 - October 2012)

Australasian Tour
Suzie Mathers (September 2013 - May 2014; February - May 2015)
Lucy Durack (May 2014 - February 2015)

Mexico City
Cecilia de la Cueva
Majo Pérez
Seoul, Korea

 Jung Sun Ah
 Ivy
 Kim So Hyun 
 Kim Bo Kyung
 Na Ha Na

São Paulo, Brazil
Fabi Bang(March 2016 - December 2016)

Stuttgart/Oberhausen, Germany 
 Lucy Scherer (2007-2008)
 Jana Stelley (2008)
 Joana Fee Würz (2010-2011)
 Valerie Link (2011)

The Hague, The Netherlands 
 Chantal Janzen (2011-2012)

Prague, Czech Republic

 Natálie Grossová
 Sára Milfajtová
 Nikola Ďuricová

Distinctions
Katie Rose Clarke has appeared in the role for more performances than any other actress.
Louise Dearman is the first actress to have portrayed both lead roles of Elphaba and Glinda.
Gina Beck is the first actress to play the role both in the UK (London) and U.S. (First National Tour).
Kristin Chenoweth, the original Broadway cast Glinda, can sing the song "Popular" in German, Japanese, Chinese, and Italian.
Lucy St. Louis is the first black woman to portray Glinda in a West End production of Wicked. On the 7th of March 2023, Alexia Khadime portrayed Elphaba alongside St. Louis, marking the first time in the history of the show where both principle roles were played by a black woman.

Explanatory notes

References

Characters in Wicked
Oz (franchise) witches
Musical theatre characters
Female characters in literature
Female characters in film
Female characters in television
Literary characters introduced in 1900
Fictional characters with air or wind abilities
Fictional characters with weather abilities
Fictional fairies and sprites
Female characters in musical theatre